USA Today magazine is a periodical published since 1978 by the Society for the Advancement of Education. It is unrelated to the USA Today newspaper. The magazine is based in West Babylon, New York. Among the topics covered by the magazine are politics, ecology, education, business, media, literature, science, and religion.

References

External links
 
 USA Today (Magazine) - issues - FindArticles - LookSmart

Monthly magazines published in the United States
Education magazines
Magazines established in 1978
Magazines published in New York (state)